Mahendra Gop (15 August 1912 – 23 November 1945) was Indian freedom struggle activist. He belonged to the Zamindar Yadav family of Rampur, currently a part of Banka district, Bihar. At the age of 32, he was hanged in Bhagalpur Camp Jail in Bihar.

Early life
Mahendra Gop was born on 15 August 1912 in zamindar family to Ram Sahay Khirhar, in Rampur village of the Banka district, in the state of Bihar. He belonged to the Majhraut clan of Yadav (Ahir).

Revolutionary activities
In Bhagalpur, Shree Parshuram Singh organised a group known as Parshuram Dal, this group chalked out a programme of taking revenge from sympathisers of British Government. The real strength of Parshuram Dal lay in Mahendra Gope, who emerged as great leader of this group.

During the Quit India movement Mahendra Gope and Parshuram Singh were important revolutionary leaders from south Bhagalpur, who gave open challenge to the government and killed a member of officers.

Mahendra Gope was very strong, energetic and daring so he earned great name in disruption and arson during the freedom movement. He plundered, thrashed and killed number of people cruelly those who were in support of Britishers. He became so much popular that he had his own group within Parshuram Dal and in this group Lakho Sahi, Jago Sahi, Shree Gope, Shridhar, Praduman and Dayanath and other people like them joined. Later Mahendra Gop became independent and became leader of Gope Dal particularly after the arrest of Parshuram Singh in May 1943.

Mahendra Gope and his group had links with Congress Socialist Party. In May 1943, his group also joined Siaram Singh's party but they were removed from the party for certain reason in June 1943.

Death
During the last half of September 1944, Mahendra Gop was arrested with ten members of his group in his hideout in the jungles of Banka subdivision in south Bhagalpur. The arrest was effected after a rapid march by a Police party through the jungle. Mahendra Gop gave a list of 20 people on a paper whom he suspected of informing against him and his friends and who were marked for murder.

On 23 November 1945, the British hanged Mahendra Gop in Bhagalpur Camp Jail.

People like Rajendra Prasad tried very hard to save Mahendra Gop from death sentence but they could not succeed.

Legacy

A sports ground has been named after the Mahendra Gop at the Eksingha in Banka district, It is known as Amar Shaheed Mahendra Gop Stadium.

See also
Bihari Ahir
Majhraut

References

1912 births
1945 deaths
Bihari Ahirs
Indian revolutionaries
People executed by British India by hanging